Maldanidae is a family of more than 200 species of marine polychaetes commonly known as bamboo worms or maldanid worms. They belong to the order Capitellida, in the phylum Annelida. They are most closely related to family Arenicolidae, and together form the clade Maldanomorpha.

Morphology
Maldanid worms have a long and cylindrical body that usually bends at one or both ends. It can be divided into four parts: 1) a head, formed by a dorsally positioned prostomium that is fused to the peristomium, sometimes with a flattened cephalic plate; 2) a thorax, formed by the first four chaetigers (i.e. chaetae-bearing segments), usually with strong spines; 3) an abdomen, with several longer chaetigers that are often followed by a number of achaetous (i.e. without chaetae) segments; 4) a posterior end, with a pygidium that contains the anus. The maldanid pygidium takes a wide variety of forms such as conical, plate-shaped and funnel-shape. Sometimes a few prepygidial (i.e. anterior to the pygidium) segments can be observed.

The parapodia are generally biramous, with elongated median chaetigers. The notochaetae appear as various forms of capillaries, while the neurochaetae appear as various forms of uncini (i.e. hook-like structures), sometimes replaced by acicular (i.e. needle-like) spines in some anterior segments.

Ecology

Habitat
Species of maldanid worms are distributed in all marine regions of Earth, from the intertidal regions to deep waters. Some species inhabit estuarine areas, and some species have been seen living on hydrothermal vents. They are benthic creatures that build tubes made of mineral particles of diverse sizes and textures; these tubes are fixed to stones, shells, algal holdfasts, mud or sandbanks through a thin and transparent matrix of mucus that is produced after the end of the larval period. Several species build tubes under rocks forming horizontal galleries, or vertical galleris in sand or mud at the bottom of estuaries.

Nutrition
They consume organic material, mostly composed of detritus, although diatoms and protozoans have been seen in the gut of some species. Most of them are head-down feeders that transport sediments upward from below the ocean floor surface. However some species have been observed dragging surface material down their tube into a feeding cavity. During feeding, the worms extend a papillae-covered globular proboscis through an increase of the coelomic pressure in the first four chaetigers. An enhanced bacterial growth observed within the tube wall of one species, Maldane sarsi, might also be a source of nutrition. Another species, Praxillura maculata, bears stiff particle-collecting spikes attached to the tube's end to collect algae and organic particles and transport them to the gut.

Reproduction
Maldanid worms are gonochoristic and present a variety of reproductive modes. Some species spawn their gametes into seawater, where fertilization occurs; others may incubate eggs in the tube or directly until the development of larvae.

They are capable of both anterior and posterior regeneration after suffering damage due to their fragile and easily fragmented bodies, and at least one species that reproduces asexually has been described.

Embryonic development
Like other invertebrates in the clade Spiralia, bamboo worms undergo spiral cleavage during their early development. The larvae have a prototroch, neurotroch and telotroch, as is common in many polychaetes. The larval period is short, and the larval development is either lecithotrophic (i.e. with a yolk sac attached for nutrition) or direct (i.e. having to feed independently).

Phylogeny
Maldanidae and Arenicolidae are united by the clade Maldanomorpha inside of Capitellida, an order of polychaetes in the phylum Annelida.
According to a phylogeny based on morphological data from 2011, several of the subfamilies inside Maldanidae are united under a clade called 'Maldanoplaca'. Members of this clade would be united by the evolution of the pygidium into an anal plate.

However, a molecular phylogeny in 2018 reveals that both Maldanoplaca and the subfamily Euclymeninae are paraphyletic.

Classification
The complete classification of bamboo worms accounts for 6 subfamilies, 38 genera and around 261 species.
Subfamily Rhodininae 
Rhodine  – 7 species
Boguea  – 2 species
Boguella  – 1 species
Subfamily Lumbriclymeninae 
Lumbriclymene  – 10 species
Lumbriclymenella  – 2 species
Clymenopsis  – 4 species
Praxillura  – 6 species
Subfamily Notoproctinae 
Notoproctus  – 9 species
Subfamily Maldaninae 
Asychis  (=Maldanopsis ; Branchioasychis ) –  5 species
Bathyasychis  – 1 species
Chirimia  (=Chrysothemis ) – c. 5 species
Maldane  (=Heteromaldane ; Sonatsa ) – 18 species
Metasychis  – 4 species
Sabaco  (=Maldanopsis ; =Branchioasychis ) – 9 species
Subfamily Euclymeninae* 
Aclymene  – 1 species
Axiothella  (=Axiotheia ) – 19 species
Clymenella  (=Paraxiothea ) – 19 species
Clymenura  – 9 species
Euclymene  (=Arwidssonia ; Caecisirrus ; Leiocephalus ) – c. 30 species
Eupraxillella  – 1 species
Gravierella  – 1 species
Heteroclymene  – 2 species
Isocirrus  – 7 species
Johnstonia  – c. 5 species
Leiochone  – 6 species
Macroclymene  – c. 5 species
Macroclymenella  – 1 species
Maldanella  (=Abyssoclymene ) – 12 species
Microclymene  – 5 species
Minusculisquama  – 1 species
Mylitta  – 1 species
Petaloclymene  – 2 species
Praxilletta  (=Iphianissa ; Praxilla ) – c. 15 species
Pseudoclymene  – 1 species
Proclymene  – 1 species
Subfamily Nicomachinae 
Micromaldane  – 7 species
Nicomache  (=Sabella ; Clymene ) – 17 species
Petalopoctus  – c. 10 species

References

Polychaetes
Annelid families